Extended detection and response (XDR) is a cybersecurity technology that monitors and mitigates cyber security threats.

Concept 
The term was coined by Nir Zuk of Palo Alto Networks in 2018.

The system works by collecting and correlating data across various network points such as servers, email, cloud workloads, and endpoints. The data is then analyzed and correlated, lending it visibility and context, and revealing advanced threats. Thereafter, the threats are prioritized, analyzed, and sorted to prevent security collapses and data loss. The XDR system helps organizations to have a higher level of cyber awareness, enabling cyber security teams to identify and eliminate security vulnerabilities.

The XDR improves the malware detection and antivirus capabilities over the endpoint detection and response (EDR) system. XDR improves on the EDR capabilities to deploy high-grade security solutions by utilizing current technologies which proactively identifies and collects security threats, and employs strategies to detect future cyber security threats. It is an alternative to reactive endpoint protection solutions, such as EDR and network traffic analysis (NTA).

See also 

 Endpoint security
 Data loss prevention software
 Endpoint detection and response

References 

Security technology